James William Bain (June 22, 1838 – October 27, 1909) was a Canadian politician and merchant. He was elected to the House of Commons of Canada in 1883 as a Member of the historical Conservative Party in the riding of Soulanges after Georges-Raoul-Léotale-Guichart-Humbert Saveuse de Beaujeu was unseated in a by-election. That election was later declared void on January 15, 1884, however, in a by-election held February 5, 1885, he was acclaimed to Soulanges. He won the election of 1887 and lost to his opponent, Joseph Octave Mousseau in the following election of 1891. Another by-election was held on February 3, 1892 after the votes in the previous election were declared void. He won this by-election and again the election was declared void on November 11, 1892 and yet again he won another by-election on December 13, 1892.

External links 
 

1838 births
1909 deaths
Conservative Party of Canada (1867–1942) MPs
Members of the House of Commons of Canada from Quebec
Place of death missing